The Accrediting Council for Independent Colleges and Schools (ACICS) is a non-profit education corporation that was recognized until 2022 by the United States Department of Education as an independent and autonomous national accrediting body. 

The accreditor's status worsened after a USA Today article in February 2020 revealed that ACICS had accredited a sham university called Reagan National University.

ACICS was established in 1912. At one time it accredited 245 institutions of higher education offering undergraduate and graduate diplomas and degrees in both traditional formats and through distance education. ACICS is incorporated in Virginia and operates from offices in Washington, D.C.

During the presidency of Barack Obama, concerns about the validity of its accreditation led the U.S. Department of Education to revoke the accreditor's recognition in 2016, making the students of schools without other accreditation ineligible for federal student aid. After a legal battle, President Donald Trump's administration undid that move. Through a lawsuit, Trump's Secretary of Education, Betsy DeVos, restored the institution's recognition (although the Council for Higher Education Accreditation (CHEA) withdrew the organization's membership).

Immediately after President Biden's inauguration in January of 2021, an independent advisory board, the National Advisory Committee on Institutional Quality and Integrity, following a recommendation from the U.S. Department of Education staff, recommended 11–1 that the ACICS lose its recognition by the U.S. Department of Education as an authorized accrediting body. In June 2021, the department again revoked ACICS recognition as an accreditor. At the time of this revocation, ACICS was an accreditor for about 60 colleges.

Federal financial aid for higher education—Pell Grants and Stafford Loans are the largest programs—requires that the aid be used at an institution whose accreditation the U.S. Department of Education recognizes. Usually, schools that lose recognized accreditation, and consequently access to federal financial aid, subsequently close.

On August 19, 2022, the US Department of Education terminated the ACICS as a nationally recognized accrediting agency losing its oversight role for the federal funding aid for education. At the time of the United States Department of Education termination of ACICS recognition, there were 27 schools accredited by ACICS with enrollment of  5,000 students.

History
ACICS was established upon the request of Benjamin Franklin Williams, President of Capital City Commercial College of Des Moines, Iowa. Upon the meeting of 22 school administrators, who met in Chicago, Illinois, on December 12, 1912, the original alliance formed the basis of National Association of Accredited Commercial Schools (NAACS), which was later renamed ACICS.

Accreditation
The scope of ACICS' recognition by the Department of Education and CHEA was defined as accreditation of private post-secondary educational institutions, both for-profit and non-profit, offering nondegree programs or associate degrees, bachelor's degrees and master's degrees in programs "designed to train and educate persons for professional, technical, or occupational careers".

As an accreditor for many for-profit colleges, ACICS provided information during U.S. Congressional investigations of for-profit education in 2010. ACICS reported that the institutions it accredits are required to demonstrate a student retention rate of at least 75 percent. Retention rates are calculated within a single academic year.

In 2015, ACICS fell under significant scrutiny after the collapse of Corinthian Colleges, a for-profit institution that was accredited by ACICS until its sudden demise. A subcommittee of the United States Senate requested information from ACICS in November 2015. Five months later, twelve state attorneys general requested that the U.S. Department of Education withdraw recognition from ACICS as a federally-recognized accreditor. The Consumer Financial Protection Bureau petitioned a federal court to order ACICS to make available information about "its decision to approve several controversial for-profit college chains", and the president of the organization, Al Gray, resigned.

Scrutiny continued in 2016 and intensified after another large chain of for-profit institutions accredited by ACICS, ITT Technical Institute, came under fire by state and federal agencies; the chain closed in 2016 and filed for bankruptcy. U.S. Senator Elizabeth Warren, a prominent critic of ACICS, released a report critical of the accreditor in June. Several days later, the U.S. Department of Education formally recommended that the accreditor's recognition be withdrawn. 

In September 2016, the chief of staff to the U.S. education secretary wrote in a letter to ACICS: "I am terminating the department's recognition of ACICS as a national recognized accrediting agency. ... ACICS's track record does not inspire confidence that it can address all of the problems effectively." The company immediately announced that it would appeal the decision within the 30 days allowed for appeal, to Education Secretary John King Jr. ACICS unsuccessfully appealed the decision and subsequently sued the Department of Education. Although Secretary of Education King finalized the process of revoking the U.S. Department of Education's recognition of ACICS as an accreditor in December 2016, ACICS's lawsuit resulted in a judge ordering Secretary of Education Betsy DeVos to review the decision in March 2018 as King did not take into account all of the evidence; DeVos subsequently restored the accreditor's recognition by the Department of Education.

Although the Department of Education continued to recognize the accreditor, many institutions left the organization while its status was in question. At the same time, many institutions formerly accredited by ACICS closed. This loss in membership, combined with the legal costs associated with the lawsuits and legal proceedings, placed the organization into financial difficulties including a $2.1 million deficit in 2019. Although the Department of Education restored its recognition of ACICS following its lawsuit, CHEA did not and ACICS withdrew its application to CHEA in early 2020. Following the inauguration of Joe Biden in 2021, the Department of Education again moved to withdraw recognition of ACICS with department staff recommending withdrawal in January and the National Advisory Committee on Institutional Quality and Integrity recommending withdrawal in March. The department made its final decision to withdraw recognition in June. ACICS can appeal the decision to the Secretary of Education and plans to do so.

Whether ACICS deserves recognition as an accreditor was called into question by an investigation by USA Today published in February 2020 that found that ACICS had accredited a school, Reagan National University, was a sham. According to this report, Reagan National University had no campus, faculty, current students, or alumni.

Due to the decertification of ACICS, Stratford University announced that it would close following the end of the Fall 2022 term.

Council Meetings
Beginning in 2021, Council meetings to present actions are made in April and November and the Annual Meeting is held in June.

See also 
List of recognized accreditation associations of higher learning
Higher education accreditation in the United States
Colleges accredited by the Accrediting Council for Independent Colleges and Schools

References

External links
 

1912 establishments in the United States
Unrecognized accreditation associations
Organizations established in 1912